Samuel Hurdsfield (19 March 1876 – 1965) was a British athlete.  He competed at the 1908 Summer Olympics in London. He was born in Knutsford.

In the 200 metres, Hurdsfield won his preliminary heat with a time of 23.6 seconds to advance to the semifinals.  There, he finished fourth and last in his heat to be eliminated without advancing to the final.

References

Sources

External links
 

1876 births
1965 deaths
Athletes (track and field) at the 1908 Summer Olympics
Olympic athletes of Great Britain
People from Knutsford
British male sprinters
English male sprinters
Sportspeople from Cheshire
20th-century British people